Dharur is a city and a municipal council in Beed district  in the state of Maharashtra, India.

Geography
It has an average elevation of 739 metres (2424 feet).

Demographics
 India census, Dharur had a population of 18,350. Males constitute 52% of the population and females 48%. Kille Dharur has an average literacy rate of 65%, higher than the national average of 59.5%: male literacy is 74% and, female literacy is 55%. In Dharur, 15% of the population is under 6 years of age.

See also

 Beed
 Maharashtra
 Kalamb, Osmanabad
 Sonesangavi
 Ambajogai
 Kaij

References

Cities and towns in Beed district
Talukas in Maharashtra